"I'm So Paid" is the second single from American singer Akon's third studio album, Freedom. The song features additional vocals from rappers Lil Wayne and Young Jeezy, and was released as a digital download worldwide and a physical single in France only on October 4, 2008.

Composition 
The song is in the key of F# major. In his opening verse, Akon mentions Jamaican Olympic Athlete Usain Bolt due to the sprinter’s love of his music. Fellow Olympian Michael Phelps is referenced in Young Jeezy's verse.

Music video
A music video for the track was filmed in September 2008 in Miami. Akon said that it would be a James Bond kind of video. The video features Lil Wayne and Young Jeezy, and was directed by Gil Green. DJ Khaled and T-Pain are featured as a cameo. Konvict Muzik artists Kardinal Offishall, Billy Blue, Tami Chynn, Bu Thiam, and Cash Money artist Lil Chuckee were also featured in a cameo. The video was released on October 30, 2008. Clothing brand Coogi underwrote the entire $1-million production cost for the video. The music video begins with Akon entering a yacht off a helicopter, giving the female dealer (Tami Chynn) a diamond in exchange for money. As Akon and another woman leave, the dealer discovers the jewelry gone, and asks her assistants to get them. Akon and the woman escape by boat and car. As Akon parked the car, he gave the money to the girl in exchange for the diamond. The girl later discovers that the money is fake.

Track listing
French CD single
 "I'm So Paid" (Feat. Lil Wayne & Young Jeezy) – 4:23
 "I'm So Paid" (Feat. Lil Wayne) (No Rap) – 3:22

Charts

Weekly charts

Year-end charts

Certifications

References

2008 singles
Akon songs
Lil Wayne songs
Songs written by Akon
Jeezy songs
Songs written by Lil Wayne
Music videos directed by Gil Green
Songs written by Detail (record producer)
Song recordings produced by Detail (record producer)
2008 songs
Universal Motown Records singles